The NHL Plus-Minus Award was a trophy awarded annually by the National Hockey League to the ice hockey "player, having played a minimum of 60 games, who leads the league in plus-minus statistics." It was sponsored by a commercial business, and it had been known under five different names. First given for performance during the  season, Wayne Gretzky won the award the most times, with three. Gretzky also led the league once prior to the inception of the award. Bobby Orr has led the NHL the most times in plus-minus, with six, all prior to the inception of the award. The award was discontinued after being awarded to Pavel Datsyuk following the  season.

History
The plus/minus statistic was first established during the 1967–68 NHL season. This statistic reflects a player's ability to contribute offensively and defensively. The award was first given at the end of the  season. During , there was no formal name for the Award.

Three-time winner Wayne Gretzky won the award the most times out of any player, and is one of only three repeat winners, joined by two-time winners John LeClair and Chris Pronger. Gretzky recorded the highest single-season result, +100, of all Award winners. The Award was won by players on the Edmonton Oilers and Detroit Red Wings four times each, with three wins by players on the Calgary Flames, Colorado Avalanche, Philadelphia Flyers, Pittsburgh Penguins and St. Louis Blues.

Including the 20 seasons the League tracked plus-minus as a statistic without an award, the Boston Bruins have led the League 11 times (six by Bobby Orr and twice by David Krejci, the only other repeat leaders), Edmonton Oilers five times (four by Wayne Gretzky, including three official awards) and four times each by players on the Detroit Red Wings, Montreal Canadiens and Philadelphia Flyers.

Winners

* Season shortened by the 1994–95 NHL lockout

Bold Player with the best plus-minus ever recorded in a season.

Plus-minus leaders (1967–1982)
Before 1983, there was no award for leading the League in plus-minus. The NHL started counting the statistics in 1967, and this lists all the leaders from the inception of the statistic to the inception of the award.

Plus-minus leaders (2008–present)
* Season shortened by the 2012–13 NHL lockout
† Season shortened by the COVID-19 pandemic

See also
List of National Hockey League awards
List of NHL players
List of NHL statistical leaders

Notes

During the 1990–91 season, there was a tie between Marty McSorley of the Los Angeles Kings and Theoren Fleury of the Calgary Flames.
During the 1998–99 season, Alexander Karpovtsev led the League with a +39 rating. However, he played in 58 games and was ineligible since there is a 60-game minimum. Therefore, LeClair was given the award with a +36 rating.
During the 2000–01 season, there was a tie between Joe Sakic of the Colorado Avalanche and Patrik Elias of the New Jersey Devils.
During the 2002–03 season, there was a tie between Peter Forsberg and Milan Hejduk of the Colorado Avalanche.
During the 2003–04 season, there was a tie between Martin St. Louis of the Tampa Bay Lighting and Marek Malik of the Vancouver Canucks.
During the 2005–06 season, there was a tie between Michal Rozsival of the New York Rangers and Wade Redden of the Ottawa Senators.
During the 2014–15 season, there was a tie between Nikita Kucherov of the Tampa Bay Lighting and Max Pacioretty of the Montreal Canadiens.
During the 2016–17 season, there was a tie between Ryan Suter and Jason Zucker of the Minnesota Wild.

References

General

Specific

Plus Minus Award